Kurt Wolff (3 March 1887 – 21 October 1963) was a German publisher, editor, writer, and journalist.

Wolff was born in Bonn, Rhenish Prussia; his mother came from a Jewish-German family. He married Elisabeth Karoline Clara Merck (1890–1970), of the Darmstadt pharmaceuticals firm, in 1909. Together with Ernst Rowohlt, Wolff began to work in publishing in Leipzig in 1908. He was the first to promote and publish Franz Kafka and Franz Werfel but declined to publish the works of Axel Munthe. Wolff's close contact to other writers in Prague and the support for unknown, but talented writers, helped him develop Kafka's friends, Max Brod and Felix Weltsch, who were more well known in Berlin and Germany.

In 1929, Wolff published the photography book Face of Our Time by August Sander.

In 1941 Wolff and his second wife, Helen Mosel, left Germany and emigrated to Paris, London, Montagnola, St. Tropez, Nice, and finally with the assistance of Varian Fry, to New York City. Later in Munich, Florence, and the United States, Wolff  developed several publishing houses. In the U.S., he and Helen founded Pantheon Books in 1942, which became well known. They later ran the Helen and Kurt Wolff Books imprint at Harcourt Brace Jovanovich. Wolff settled in Switzerland in the 1950s. He died after a driving accident and is buried with Helen in Marbach, Germany.

The Helen and Kurt Wolff Translator's Prize is named in honor of him and his wife.
His son, Christian Wolff, is a renowned avant-garde musician. His grandson Alexander (son of Nicholas) wrote a family history, published in 2021 as Endpapers: A Family Story of Books, War, Escape, and Home.

Literary archives
The Beinecke Rare Book and Manuscript Library at Yale University holds the Kurt Wolff Archive, 1907–38. The collection contains about 4,100 letters and manuscripts from the files of the Kurt Wolff Verlag from the years 1910–30. A portion of the Kurt Wolff Archive is currently available online.

References

External links

Kurt Wolff Archive. Yale Collection of German Literature. Beinecke Rare Book and Manuscript Library.
Helen and Kurt Wolff Papers. Yale Collection of German Literature, Beinecke Rare Book and Manuscript Library.

1887 births
1963 deaths
German book publishers (people)
German male journalists
Jewish emigrants from Nazi Germany to the United States
Jewish emigrants from Nazi Germany to the United Kingdom
Businesspeople from Bonn
People from the Rhine Province
German male writers
American book publishers (people)
20th-century German journalists